Victor Nysted (21 February 1889 – 23 December 1949) was a Norwegian footballer. He played in two matches for the Norway national football team in 1908 to 1911.

References

External links
 

1889 births
1949 deaths
Norwegian footballers
Norway international footballers
Place of birth missing
Association footballers not categorized by position